Safa Saidani (born 26 May 1990) is a Tunisian table tennis player. She competed at the 2016 Summer Olympics in the women's singles event, in which she was eliminated in the preliminary round by Dina Meshref.

References

1990 births
Living people
Tunisian female table tennis players
Olympic table tennis players of Tunisia
Table tennis players at the 2016 Summer Olympics
Competitors at the 2019 African Games
African Games bronze medalists for Tunisia
African Games medalists in table tennis
21st-century Tunisian women
20th-century Tunisian women